Jagdamba Rhinos is a cricket team that represents in the Everest Premier League. Shakti Gauchan, former captain of Nepal national cricket team, is the captain of the team, whereas Navin Singh is the head coach.

They were the runners-up of the One Day tournament in the 2014 NPL.

Players

Current Squad of Jagdamba Giants 
 Shakti Gauchan (c)
 Mahesh Chhetri
 Naresh Budhayer
 Sompal Kami
 Nizamudeen Ansari
 Haseem Ansari
 Subendu Pandey
 Amit Dahal
 Ajay Rajbansi
 Pawan Shrestha
 Santosh Koirala
 Sandeep Sapkota

References

External links 
 

Cricket teams in Nepal
Everest Premier League
Cricket clubs established in 2014
2014 establishments in Nepal